Delias schoenigi is a species of pierine butterfly endemic Mindanao in the Philippines.

The wingspan is 55–62 mm.

Subspecies
Delias schoenigi schoenigi (Mt. Apo, south-central Mindanao)
Delias schoenigi hermeli Samusawa & Kawamura, 1988 (Mt. Kitanlad, central Mindanao)
Delias schoenigi malindangeana Nakano & Yagishita, 1993 (Mt. Malindang, western Mindanao)
Delias schoenigi pasiana Nakano & Yagishita, 1993 (Mt. Pasian, eastern Mindanao)
Delias schoenigi samusawai Yagishita & Morita, 1996 (Mt. Matutum, southern Mindanao)

References

schoenigi
Butterflies described in 1975